Grand Gulf State Park may refer to:
* Grand Gulf State Park (Missouri)
 Grand Gulf Military State Park, a park in Mississippi

See also
 Grand Gulf (disambiguation)